Nicholas McGaughey is a Welsh television actor and voice actor best known for playing the character of Brandon Monk in the Welsh soap Pobol y Cwm. He has appeared on a number of top English television programmes such as Casualty in 1998. He also appeared as Praetorian Officer in the 2000 Hollywood blockbuster, Gladiator, among actors such as Russell Crowe and Oliver Reed. He also appeared in Sharpe's Gold in 1995 from the TV series Sharpe starring Sean Bean.

He appeared in various TV Series including War and Peace (2016) as Self Important Major, Da Vinci’s Demons (2014) as Captain Sindona and also the same year in Musketeers "Friends and Enemies" as Innkeeper. He also appeared in Agatha Christie’s Poirot "The Labours of Hercules" in 2013 as Inspector Lementeuil. Also in 2013 he appeared in Atlantis "Twist if Fate" as Biton, Whitechapel as Derek Redman and New Tricks as Coxy.

He appeared on the Welsh television series Pobol y Cwm in the role of Brandon Monk from 2002 to 2011. His character was killed off on 23 September 2011 after suffering a heart attack in hospital following the fire in the flat above the chip shop (Y Sosban Chips.)

McGaughey is also a published writer of poetry and short fiction. His poem "Magic Hour" was performed at Holyhead, Wales, at dusk as part of the 21 December 2017 Solstice Shorts Festival and published in the 2018 anthology Dusk from Arachne Press.

Filmography

References

External links

Welsh male television actors
Welsh male soap opera actors
Living people
People from Morriston
Male actors from Portsmouth
Year of birth missing (living people)